Irma Contreras (born 1928) is a former dancer, choreographer, and ballet teacher. She is part of the 1940s generation of Venezuelan dancers. She created and founded the National Ballet of Venezuela with her sister .

Career 

Contreras began her ballet studies in Caracas with Argentine teachers Hery and Luz Thomson in an experimental class that opened at the Andrés Bello School around 1945.

In 1948 she entered the National Ballet School, directed by Nena Coronil. Together with Vicente Nebrada, she travelled to Cuba in 1952 and danced in the Alicia Alonso Ballet. Upon her return to Venezuela she entered the newly created Ballet Nena Coronil in 1953. During the Marcos Pérez Jiménez government, Contreras applied for a scholarship to study abroad, to expand her knowledge of ballet; the scholarship was granted and, with Nebreda and Graciela Henríquez, she travelled to Paris. While in France, she danced with the ballet companies of Jean Guelis and Paul Goubert. In 1957 she returned to Venezuela and founded the National Ballet of Venezuela with her sister Margot, the first professional ballet company in the country.

Irma Contreras has been a guest teacher of numerous ballet companies and has taught workshops on the Cecchetti Method.

In 2004 she published the book Danza Clásica, nomenclatura y metodología (English: Classical dance, nomenclature and methodology).

Choreographies

Originals 
 Estudio en Do mayor (Bizet)
 Contrapunto (Bach)
 Arcanas (Varese)

Based on others 
 Don Quijote (pas de deux)
 El Corsario (pas de deux)
 Aguas primaverales
 Las Sílfides
 El lago de los cisnes (segundo acto)

Awards 
 1983: Premio Consejo Nacional de Cultura de Danza Clásica.
 2004-2005: Premio Nacional de Danza
 2008: Orden Mérito al Trabajo, renglón Danza Clásica

References

Bibliography 
 PAOLILLO, Carlos. Una aventura, un hito. Ballet Nacional de Venezuela 1957–1980. Editado por Asociación Civil Publicaciones La Danza. Producción e impresión: Ediplus producción, C.A. Caracas, 2004.

External links 
 Todo es historia.  El Centro de Investigación, Documentación e Información del Instituto Universitario de Danza realizó una exposición que representa la primera aproximación a la historia de la danza escénica venezolana.
 Historia: Ballet Nacional de Venezuela. Autor: Carlos Paolillo

1928 births
Living people
People from Caracas
Venezuelan choreographers
Dance teachers
Venezuelan female dancers